Cornmarket may be:

 Cornmarket Group Financial Services Ltd, Ireland
 Cornmarket Press, the original name of the Haymarket Group when it started in the 1950s
 Cornmarket Street, a shopping street in central Oxford, England
 Corn exchange (as corn market), a building where farmers and merchants historically traded cereal grains.